CBOI may refer to:

Cross Border Orchestra of Ireland
Central Bank of Ireland